This article provides details of international football games played by the Senegal national football team from 2020 to present.

Results

2020

2021

2022

2023

Notes

References

Football in Senegal
Senegal national football team
2020s in Senegalese sport